Jermone Gregory Finn (March 31, 1969 – August 21, 2008), sometimes credited as "Huckle" Jerry Finn, was an American record producer and mix engineer. He worked with numerous punk rock and pop-punk artists such as Blink-182, AFI, Sum 41, Alkaline Trio, Green Day, Morrissey, MxPx, and Rancid. Finn was known for the warm guitar tone present on albums he produced as well as the "punchy" sound of his mixes. He was instrumental in developing the polished sound of pop-punk its second wave of popularity between the mid-1990s and early 2000s.

A graduate of the Dick Grove School of Music, Finn began his career in the early 1990s as an assistant engineer at various Hollywood-based studios. He began an association with producer Rob Cavallo, with whom he engineered and mixed Green Day's Dookie (1994). Finn's career subsequently prospered, as he moved from being an engineer to producing albums with the likes of Pennywise and Rancid. Finn forged a strong bond with Blink-182, producing four albums with them, beginning with Enema of the State (1999). He also worked extensively with Sum 41 and Alkaline Trio. Over the course of the 2000s, Finn worked on numerous albums with Morrissey before his sudden death in 2008.

Known for his kind manner and technical expertise, Finn was valued by engineers and musicians alike. Scott Heisel of Alternative Press wrote that Finn often "helped rough punk bands refine their sound, and helped them discover the power of a good vocal hook."

Life and career
Jerry Finn was born on March 31, 1969, in Ventura, California. When asked about his ancestry in a later interview, Finn did not know, noting he was adopted. The first music he remembered hearing was the soundtrack to Fiddler on the Roof. He attended Dick Grove School of Music. He became an assistant at The Music Grinder in Hollywood in the early 1990s, and he was later hired as a second engineer. Finn then moved to Devonshire Sound Studios, where he met Rob Cavallo. He became a "right-hand man" to Cavallo, who at the time was producing Green Day's major-label debut, Dookie (1994). When the band declared themselves dissatisfied with the original mix, Finn and Cavallo set to work again and came up with a brighter mix. "Anyone who heard Green Day's first two records knew the breakout potential was there, but it took Cavallo and Finn to draw it out," wrote Alternative Press.

Afterwards, Finn worked as an assistant at Conway Recording Studios, which he regarded as his favorite studio to work in. He left the job after several months to pursue work independently because of the success of Dookie. "Being realistic about the music business, I thought I'd have a red[-]hot career for six months and then be back assisting, so when I left I made them promise that when my career fell apart they'd hire me back as an assistant," Finn joked in 2006. According to engineer Ed Cherney, Dookie's success made Finn "the great hope of every assistant engineer everywhere." Finn characterized the massive change in his life thanks to the success of the album: "Before [Green Day], I was an assistant making eight bucks an hour. I was producing gold records less than a year after them." Soon, Finn began a fruitful association with Epitaph Records, and he co-produced Pennywise's About Time (1995) alongside the label's founder, Bad Religion guitarist Brett Gurewitz. Finn's first solo production endeavor, Rancid's …And Out Come the Wolves, came the same year. He mixed the "landmark punk album" Dear You by Jawbreaker in 1995 and The Suicide Machines' Destruction by Definition in 1996, the latter described by Alternative Press as "a watershed moment for ska-punk."

Finn forged a particularly strong bond with Blink-182 in the late 1990s. He first worked with the band to record "Mutt" for the American Pie soundtrack, after which he produced their breakthrough album Enema of the State and they chose to "never work with anyone else again." According to writer James Montgomery, "[Finn] served as an invaluable member of the Blink team: part adviser, part impartial observer, he helped smooth out tensions and hone their multiplatinum sound." When recording sessions became contentious, Finn would often smooth over differences with humor, advice, and a new perspective, according to bassist Mark Hoppus. "Recording can get pretty monotonous, but at least we could laugh with Jerry. A pretty typical day would involve multiple takes for one part of one song, and then everyone would get naked and jump on Jerry," he said. He subsequently returned to produce The Mark, Tom, and Travis Show (2000), Take Off Your Pants and Jacket (2001) and Blink-182 (2003). He also produced the 2002 self-titled debut album by Box Car Racer, which featured guitarist Tom DeLonge and drummer Travis Barker, and co-produced and mixed When Your Heart Stops Beating (2006) by +44, which featured Hoppus and Barker.

Finn co-produced AFI's major-label debut Sing the Sorrow (2003), which has been called a "landmark in the post-hardcore genre." Alternative Press wrote that "None of it would've been possible had Jerry Finn not manned the boards and polished the band's previously metallic sound into spike-covered punk-rock candy cane." In his later years, Finn worked with Morrissey on his best-selling You Are the Quarry (2004). Morrissey was introduced to Finn via a mutual friend and was effusive about his work: "He made me feel very confident. He's not easily pleased and he's not prepared to be overwrought. He knows exactly what he wants to do." Finn's last production credits included Decemberunderground (2006) by AFI, Music from Regions Beyond (2007) by Tiger Army, and Years of Refusal (2009), for which he reunited with Morrissey.

Death
In July 2008, Finn suffered an intracerebral hemorrhage followed by a massive heart attack. He was taken off of life support on August 9 after never regaining consciousness, and he died on August 21, 2008.

Recording style and influences

Finn was known for his dynamic, warm guitar sound, featured prominently on Blink-182 albums and Sum 41's All Killer No Filler (2001). "Whenever I could corner him at a party, I harassed him about how he gets guitar sounds and how he gets his mixes to sound so punchy," said producer and Goldfinger frontman John Feldmann. Finn achieved the sound by recording instruments through more than one amplifier at the same time. "Many engineers try to keep everything separate and add effects later," said Finn. "Players play to the sound, so you just have to get a sound and go with it. This allows you to mix tones together to get just the right sound." Finn reportedly owned over 100 guitars, and he would often bring large collections of instruments and amplifiers to the studio.

He estimated that it took him 10–12 days to mix an album, though some took less or more. Upon reviewing rough mixes, Finn would attempt to craft the mix around the "sound in [his] head" he created. In mixing songs, Finn preferred to first "get the drums happening to where they have some ambience," followed by the vocal tracks. In terms of mixing bass and drums—"perhaps the most difficult task of a mixing engineer," according to Bobby Owsinski—Finn preferred to have the "kick [drum] and the bass ... occupying their own territory and not fighting each other." He felt the "sound of modern records today is compression. Every time I try to be a purist and go, 'You know, I'm not gonna compress that,' the band comes in and goes, 'Why isn't that compressed?'" When setting the compressor, Finn would set the attack slow and the release fast so that "all the transients are getting through and initial punch is still there, but it releases instantly when the signal drops below threshold." Finn called this "the sound of my mixes. It keeps things kinda popping the whole time."

Blink-182 bassist Mark Hoppus called Finn "meticulous in getting great sounds". Considering recording drums to be a "lost art," Finn took great interest in this step of the process. He often focused on room microphones to capture drum ambience naturally. This proved frustrating to Blink drummer Travis Barker: "For hours and hours, Jerry would be adjusting microphones. [...] I'd sit around drinking coffee and smoking cigarettes, just praying that I'd be able to start playing soon." As for Finn's producing style, Barker wrote, "[Jerry] was more about giving us ideas and lending an extra set of ears. He'd say, 'Hey, that sounds cool—why doesn't that part at the end go a little longer?' Or 'What if this song had an intro?'" Frequent collaborators to Finn included drum technician Mike Fasano, and engineers Sean O'Dwyer, Ryan Hewitt and Joe McGrath. He was also known for working with keyboardist Roger Joseph Manning Jr., whom he brought into Blink-182, Alkaline Trio and Morrissey sessions. Finn credited John Bonham as a musical inspiration growing up, and Don Was, Ed Cherney, Mick Guzauski, John Purdell, and Duane Baron as influential on his recording techniques.

Legacy
Finn was known for his genial demeanor and technical prowess. According to Pierre Perrone of The Independent, "He could act as a sounding board or confidant and push musicians and singers to perform at their best. He would order food and shoot the breeze with his clients and generally create a relaxed atmosphere." Finn would occasionally mix albums for independent bands or friends "from anywhere from free to half [his] rate" because he enjoyed the music. Bobby Owsinski, author of The Mixing Engineer's Handbook, wrote that Finn "represented one of the new generation of mixers who knows all the rules but is perfectly willing to break them." After his death, Alternative Press compiled a list of nine "classic" albums helmed by Finn, writing that "Finn's bread and butter during the past decade was helping rough punk bands refine their sound, and helping them discover the power of a good vocal hook."

Finn's impact on Blink-182 led bassist Mark Hoppus to dub him the "fourth member" of the band. "Every day I spent with Jerry over the past 10 years, I feel like he taught me something new about music, or recording, or life," he wrote after his passing. "Jerry wasn't some asshole rolling up to the studio in a Bentley—he was one of us. He could be honest with us, and we would listen to him," drummer Travis Barker remembered in his memoir Can I Say (2015). When the band reconvened to work on their reunion album Neighborhoods (2011), the band found it very difficult to work without Finn. They continued to work alone until 2016, when they recruited producer John Feldmann for their seventh album California. Feldmann considered himself a disciple of Finn, commenting, "the sound of my records was influenced by the records Jerry made."

Production discography
This list does not include greatest hits compilations. Finn was producer unless otherwise noted.

Notes

References

Footnotes

Sources

External links
 
 

1969 births
2008 deaths
Record producers from California
American audio engineers
People from Ventura, California
Punk rock record producers
Engineers from California
20th-century American engineers